Jazz in Silhouette is the third studio album by pianist-composer Sun Ra and His Arkestra. It was recorded on March 6, 1959, and released in May of the same year. The album was recorded in Chicago during a session that also included the whole of the albums Sound Sun Pleasure!! and "Interstellar Low Ways" from the album of the same name.

Background
Critics have described the album as one of Ra's best from his relatively conventional early-career Chicago period before veering off into 'full-fledged explorations into the avant-garde'  that characterises the recordings made in New York City in the 1960s.

Recorded in 1959 at El Saturn Studio, Chicago, the album is one of three records that the Arkestra released in the 1950s, the other two being Jazz by Sun Ra and Super-Sonic Jazz. Originally released in a simple silk-screened cover credited to HP Corbissero, the album had gained its sci-fi cover, 'of half-naked women teleporting themselves over one of the moons of Saturn', credited to 'Evans'  by the early 1960s. The album was reissued by Impulse in 1974, and released on CD by Evidence in 1992. When reissued by Impulse! on LP and Evidence on CD, the album's sides were reversed. Enlightenment, in particular, was to become a staple of the Arkestra's concerts, often featuring chanted lyrics.

Reception

The Penguin Guide to Jazz selected this album as part of its suggested "Core Collection" and awarded it a "crown" accolade, stating "This marvellous record will one day be recognised as one of the most important jazz records since the war."

Track listing

Evidence: Compact Disc and Impulse!: 12" Vinyl
 "Enlightenment" (Hobart Dotson, Ra) – (5:02)
 "Saturn" – (3:37)
 "Velvet" – (3:18)
 "Ancient Aiethopia" – (9:04)
 "Hours After" (Ra, Everett Turner) – (3:41)
 "Horoscope" – (3:43)
 "Images" – (3:48)
 "Blues at Midnight" – (11:56)

For some years the record was believed to have been recorded in 1958, until the musicologist and discographer Robert Campbell uncovered the original tape box, clearly dated March 6, 1959. The album's release was mentioned a few months later in the Chicago Defender of June 9 (Sun Ra Discs Hit Album!).

Musicians
Sun Ra - Piano, celeste, gong
Hobart Dotson - Trumpet
Pat Patrick - Baritone sax, flute, percussion
Charles Davis - Baritone sax, percussion
John Gilmore - Tenor sax, percussion
William Cochran - Drums
Marshall Allen - Alto sax, flute
James Spaulding - Alto sax, flute, percussion
Ronnie Boykins - Bass
Bo Bailey - Trombone

References

External links
Complete Sun Ra's Discography

Sun Ra albums
1959 albums
El Saturn Records albums
Impulse! Records albums
Evidence Music albums